The tenth season of the Dutch TV series Wie is de Mol? ("Who is the Mole?") aired in the winter of 2010. Pieter Jan Hagens returned to host for his third season, with guest appearances from former hosts, Angela Groothuizen and Karel van der Graaf. The season took place in Japan, marking the fourth time the series has filmed in Asia, after Bali in season 5, Thailand in season 7 and Jordan in season 9. The season premiered on January 7, 2010. The Reunion aired on March 25, 2010 where Frits Sissing was declared the winner of the season, earning a grand total of €21,950.-. Sissing was faster in completing the final test than his runner-up Sanne Vogel, to successfully unmasked Kim Pieters as the Mole of 2010.

Format
Followed the same format as its Belgian predecessor, ten Dutch celebrities travel to Japan to complete Assignments to earn money for the group pot. However, one of the ten is the titular Mole, the one designated to sabotage the assignments and cause the group to earn the least amount of money for the winner's pot as possible. Every few days, players would take a 20-question multiple choice test about the identity of the Mole. Once the test is complete, the candidates await their results in an Execution ceremony. The candidate with the worst score is executed from the game, while in the event of the tie the candidate who completed their test the slowest is executed. The season plays out until there are three remaining candidates, where they must complete a final test (consisting of 40 questions). The candidate with the highest score, or had completed their test the fastest in a tie, is declared the winner and receives the group's pot.

The season had tributes to the past 9 seasons, including having the first two hosts of the program join the cast in Japan for an assignment, and the game beginning with instructions handed to the candidates by a famous past Mole at Schiphol.

Candidates
A full list of the candidates and the host in on IMDb.

Notes

Candidates Progress
The order in which the candidates learned their results are indicated in the table below.

  The candidate saw a Green Screen to proceeded to the next Episode.
 The candidate used Jokers for this test, and saw a Green Screen to proceed to the next Episode.
 The candidate used Jokers for this test, however, they did not see a Green Screen before the Executed player saw their Red Screen. Thus they proceeded to the next Episode.
 The candidate did not see a Green Screen before the Executed player saw their Red Screen. Thus they proceeded to the next Episode.
 The candidate received an Exemption to automatically proceed to the next Episode.
 The candidate was executed from the game and sent home.
 The candidate had to withdraw from the game due to falling ill and missing too many assignments.
Notes

Episodes
For more information, see: List of seasons of "Wie is de Mol?"

Notes

Season Summary

Episode 1

Megami Ohashi Bridge - Max. €8,000.-

Four candidates were placed on top of pillars on the Megami Ohashi Bridge in Nagasaki. Another four candidates were placed on a boat in the river, and must try to identify which candidate is on which pillar and raise color flags to indicate their findings to the last remaining two candidates in a helicopter. The two helicopter candidates must correctly translate the boat's codes to open four locked chests on the Helipad. Opening each chest added €1,000 to the pot. If all four chests were opened, an additional €4,000.- would be added to the pot.

The group only managed to open one chest and add €1,000 to the pot.

Symbolic Pairs - Max. €2,000.-

Eight candidates were tasked to purchase items in a local neighborhood in Nagasaki that easily represented them. In two pairs of duos, they must walk along a canal with 8 photographs and correctly pair the photographs with the correct item. Replacing the stand-in photo of the candidate for one of their own if they felt it was incorrect. The last two candidates then had to confirm the matches, being allowed to make two changes in total. For every correct match, €250 would be added to the pot.

Loretta and Manuel successfully matched all the items with the remaining candidates, adding €2,000 to the pot.

Episode 2

Nagasaki Tram Hunt - Max. €2,500.-

In three teams, the candidates must take a Tram line to three stops. At each stop, a team must step out and search for two tubes in that area, without opening them before returning to the tram. All the tubes were hidden in locations connected to Dutch history with Japan in the city. The teams had to arrive at the location Pieter Jan was awaiting for them within 1 hour. On the tram, a laptop awaited the candidates, where they could chat to Pieter Jan using the clues inside their tubes. The clues eventually would lead the candidates to finish location, a Dutch statue donated to Japan in memory of the two countries' shared history.

The group arrived in time and added €2,500 to the pot.

Yakuza Village - Max. €3,000.-

Blindfolded and taken to a Dutch Village near Nagasaki, the candidates were tasked to find money hidden in the village. Two at a time, or by themselves they could explore the village, while avoiding men in suits. Throughout the village are buttons that reveal maps for the candidates in the safe house to direct the explorers. The candidates have an hour to retrieve the money and avoid being shot by the men outside to succeed in the assignment.

All the candidates were caught by men in black suits, failing the assignment.

In Jokers We Trust

In the Dutch village, the candidates were tasked to form pairs that trusted each other. Each pair were split into two groups, with the lone candidate joining one group. Pieter Jan would offer an increasing amount of Jokers to each group, where the candidates could only take once, with Pieter Jan deciding if more than one candidate attempts to claim Jokers at the same time. Whatever a candidate claims, belongs to their partner.

After both groups have claimed jokers. They had to negotiate with their partners to trade their Jokers or not. Immediately after the assignment, the candidates partook in the test where their partner got to witness them writing the test and possibly play their Jokers.

Episode 3

Japanese Driving Exam

The candidates were taken to a Test Driving Facility to pass a Japanese Driving Exam. Four drivers, and three instructors. The rules were that the drivers had to finish where they had started, drive through every route only once all within half an hour. The three instructors had to communicate over radio phones with instructions to routes with money on them.

Official driving instructors accompanied the drivers throughout the assignment to inspect their driving. The candidates committed several faults, however, they had all driven over the same part of routes multiple times, breaking the rules and failing the assignment automatically.

Dining with Guests - Max. €3,000.-

Invited to a luxurious lunch, the candidates were joined with former hosts, Angela Groothuizen and Karel van de Graaf. One by one, the candidates were escorted to a side room during the lunch to be informed of their assignment: To convince Groothuizen and Van de Graaf to point to them as the Mole at the end of the lunch.

If Groothuizen and Van de Graaf had successfully pointed out the Mole, the group would lose €3,000 from the pot. If they had failed, the group would earn €3,000 for the pot. The result would become known if the chosen candidate is executed or revealed to be the Mole at the end of the season.

Save or Send Home - Max. €2,000.-

At the Execution, it was revealed that Barbara was potentially the executed candidate. However, the group were informed that they could earn more money before the ceremony had ended. One by one, the safe candidates had to decide if they were giving her a green topito or red, hiding the topitos under bowls for Barbara to pick. If Barbara successfully found 4 green topitos, it would form an exemption to save her. If not, €2,000 would be added to the pot, and she would be sent home.

The candidates all decided to keep Barbara, forgoing the €2,000 for the pot.

Episode 4

High School Examination - Max. €2,500.-

Divided into three teams, two duos, and a trio of those with the lowest grades in school; the candidates are given 10 tasks worth €250 each to complete in 20 minutes. Each team has 5 minutes to provide Pieter Jan an answer for the classroom that they have entered. If they are incorrect, one candidate in the team must remain in the room while the rest carry on. Any candidates who have answered correctly may return to Pieter Jan to cash in on their earnings, however, if no candidates arrive within the time limit, the assignment is failed.

None of the candidates returned to Pieter Jan in time, failing the assignment despite answering two questions correctly.

Sandbag Meeting - Max. €4,000.-

Upon arriving in Sendai, the candidates were divided into two groups and placed on opposite ends of a trail. The groups earn money for the pot depending on how many sandbags they manage to carry, and where they meet in the middle of the trail within an hour and a half time limit.

The group managed to meet with 28 bags, at the €3,000.- meeting point, earning - Max. €1,200 out of a total €4,000 for the pot.

Chain Gang - Max. €3,200.-

Before starting dinner while camping in Sendai, the candidates were chained together in the woods. In the middle of the group stood a trap that held a master key and an Exemption.
Each candidate that chooses to free themselves with the key, adds an increasing amount of money into the pot. Meanwhile, if a candidate chooses the Exemption, the assignment is over with everyone including the Exempt candidate still chained together will spend the rest of the night outside. The trap opens every 15 minutes. If every candidate freed themselves they would earn €3,200 for the pot.

All the candidates chose to free themselves, except for Frits who remained last and took the Exemption for himself, adding €1,600 for the pot.

Episode 5

Episode 6

Episode 7

Episode 8

Episode 9 - Finale

Episode 10 - Reunion
Notes

Reception
For more information, see: List of seasons of "Wie is de Mol?"

Viewing Figures

Awards and nominations
''For more information, see: Gouden Televizier-Ring Gala

References

2000s TV shows in the Netherlands
Television shows set in Japan
Television shows filmed in Japan
2010 Dutch television seasons